Stella Beck (born 25 September 1995) is a New Zealand professional basketball player.

Early life
Raised in Eastbourne, Hutt Valley, Beck attended Hutt Valley High School in Lower Hutt.

Career

Early years
In 2012, Beck debuted in New Zealand's Women's Basketball Championship (WBC) for the Hutt Valley Flyers, earning Junior Player of the Year. She was named WBC MVP in 2013 and led Hutt Valley to the championship. She continued in the WBC in 2014 for the Capital Flyers.

College
Beck played college basketball for the Saint Mary's Gaels between 2014 and 2018.

Saint Mary's statistics
Source

Professional
After a stint in the Queensland Basketball League for the Townsville Flames, Beck joined the Townsville Fire for the 2018–19 WNBL season. In 2019, she played for the Launceston Tornadoes in the NBL1 before joining the Melbourne Boomers for the 2019–20 WNBL season. She continued with the Boomers for the 2020 WNBL Hub season in Queensland.

In 2021, Beck returned to New Zealand and played for the Capital Swish in the Women's NBL. In 2022, she joined the Tokomanawa Queens and helped them win the inaugural Tauihi Basketball Aotearoa championship.

National team
Beck made her international debut in 2011 at the FIBA Oceania Under-16 Championship. She played for New Zealand in 2012 at the FIBA Oceania U18 Championship and then made her senior debut in 2013 at the FIBA Oceania Championship. She continued to play for the Tall Ferns in 2015, 2016 and 2019.

Personal life
Beck's father, Shawn, is a basketball coach. He was raised and educated in the United States.

References

1995 births
Living people
Guards (basketball)
Melbourne Boomers players
New Zealand women's basketball players
Saint Mary's Gaels women's basketball players
Townsville Fire players
Tauihi Basketball Aotearoa players